"A Day in the Death" is the eighth episode of the second series of British science fiction television series Torchwood.

A Day in the Death may also refer to:

Theatre, film and TV
A Day in the Death of Joe Egg, 1967 play by the English playwright Peter Nichols
A Day in the Death of Joe Egg (film), 1972 film based on the play of the same name by Peter Nichols
A Day in the Death of Donny B, 1969 American short docudrama

Music
"A Day in the Death", song from Testament album Dark Roots of Earth
"A Day in the Death", song from Johnny Truant album In the Library of Horrific Events